HMS Carstairs was a Hunt-class minesweeper of the Royal Navy from World War I. She was originally to be named Cawsand, but this was changed to avoid any conflict between the vessel name and a coastal location.

On 4 January 1924 she was renamed HMS Dryad, but reverted to Carstairs on 15 August 1924.

See also
 Carstairs, South Lanarkshire

References

External links
 A scale model of Carstairs is held by National Museums Scotland

 

Hunt-class minesweepers (1916)
Royal Navy ship names
1919 ships